Thanh Hóa station is one of the main railway stations on the North–South railway (Reunification Express) in Vietnam. It serves the city of Thanh Hóa.

Thanh Hóa
Railway stations in Vietnam
Buildings and structures in Thanh Hóa province